is a Japanese light novel series by Okina Kamino with illustrations by Eizo Hoden and Nishieda. The series, which consists of 20 volumes, was published by Media Factory under their MF Bunko J label from October 25, 2003, to February 25, 2015. A manga adaptation by 888 started serialization in the seinen manga magazine Monthly Comic Alive on August 26, 2006. An anime adaptation premiered on July 10, 2010. Funimation has licensed and dubbed the anime series in English with their in-house production voice cast and released it on home media in 2012. Manga Entertainment has licensed the series in the UK.

Plot

Kio Kakazu is a kindhearted, yet sophisticated guy who is living a dull and boring life on Okinawa. One day, after attending a funeral for the death of one of his ancestors, he is introduced to a girl with cat ears named Eris. Next morning, he finds her sleeping next to him half-naked. She explains to him that she is an alien and that she has come to Earth to learn more about its inhabitants.

But unbeknownst to them, fanatical alien worshippers and mysterious organizations are in hot pursuit for Eris. To make matters worse, Kio's friends turn out to be a part of those organizations. Now it is up to Kio to protect Eris from these shady organizations. But does he have the bravery and skills to do that?

Media

Light novels

Manga

Anime

Drama CDs
A series of four drama CDs were released by Geneon Entertainment.

Video game
A video game adaptation  developed by Idea Factory was released on PlayStation 2 on July 27, 2006.

References

Further reading

External links

Official anime site (in Japanese, archived)

2003 Japanese novels
2006 manga
2010 anime television series debuts
2010 Japanese television series endings
Anime and manga based on light novels
Anime International Company
Bandai Namco franchises
Catgirls
Digital Manga Publishing titles
Funimation
Harem anime and manga
Kadokawa Dwango franchises
Light novels
Madman Entertainment anime
Mainichi Broadcasting System original programming
Media Factory manga
MF Bunko J
Okinawa Prefecture in fiction
Romantic comedy anime and manga
School life in anime and manga
Science fiction anime and manga
Seinen manga